Jacob Baal-Teshuva (born 1929) is an Israeli-American author, journalist, art critic, appraiser, and curator. 

He studied at the Hebrew University of Jerusalem and at the New York University. Beginning his career as a free-lance journalist at the United Nations, his character, skills, and love of art enabled him to promote artists in print while developing deep life long relationships with artists and collectors. He is a high-level art specialist whose writings, exhibitions, and collection building embraces artists such as Marc Chagall, Christo and Jeanne-Claude, Mark Rothko, Yves Klein, Joan Mitchell, Jean-Michel Basquiat, Louis Comfort Tiffany, and Andy Warhol among others. Aviva, his wife, was also an artist. They amassed a collection of works, the majority of which were sold in a single collection sale at Sothebys; this sale, "An Artistic Home," records a partial list of their favorite artists.  
Jacob maintains one of the most important private art libraries in the world.  He lives and works in New York and Paris.

Published books
Menashe Kadishman, Kadishman, Menashe, and Jacob Baal-Teshuva. Menashe Kadishman. Munich: Prestel Verlag, 2007.
Faces of the Art World, Baal-Teshuva, Jacob, and Pierre Restany. Faces of the Art World: Photography of Jacob Baal-Teshuva; 4 July 2003 - 4 August 2003, National Center of Photography of Russian Federation = Lica Mira Iskusstva. 2003.
Mark Rothko: Picture as Drama, Baal-Teshuva, Jacob, and Mark Rothko. Mark Rothko, 1903-1970: Pictures as Drama. 2003.
Francesco Clemente and Jean-Michel Basquiat, Baal-Teshuva, Jacob, Francesco Clemente, and Jean-Michel Basquiat. Jean Michel Basquiat: Gemälde Und Arbeiten Auf Papier = Paintings and Works on Paper. Künzelsau: Swiridoff, 2001.
Louis Comfort Tiffany, Baal-Teshuva, Jacob. Louis Comfort Tiffany. Köln: Taschen, 2001.
Marc Chagall, Baal-Teshuva, Jacob, and Marc Chagall. Marc Chagall, 1887-1985. Kol̈n: Taschen, 1998.
Alexander Calder, Baal-Teshuva, Jacob, and Alexander Calder. Calder, 1898-1976. Kol̈n: Taschen, 1998.
Chagall: a Retrospective, Chagall, Marc, and Jacob Baal-Teshuva. Chagall: A Retrospective. [NY]: Hugh Lauter Levin Assoc., Inc, 1995.
Christo and Jeanne-Claude: Koln, Baal-Teshuva, Jacob, Christo, Jeanne-Claude, and Wolfgang Volz. Christo & Jeanne-Claude. Köln: Benedikt Taschen, 1995.
Christo and Jeanne-ClaudeE: Running Fence, Baal-Teshuva, Jacob, Christo & Jeanne-Claude, Photos Wolfgang Volz. Running Fence: Sonoma and Marin Counties, California 1972-76: Taschen 1995. 
Christo: the Reichstag and Urban Projects, Baal-Teshuva, Jacob, Christ and Jeanne-Claude,...The Reichstag and Urban Projects, Munchen Prestel, 1993
Andy Warhol: Works from the Collection of Jose Mugrabi and an Isle of Man Co
Baal-Teshuva, Jacob. Andy Warhol, 1928-1987: works from the collections of José Mugrabi and an Isle of Man company. Munich: Prestel, 1993.
Art Treasures of the United Nations, Baal-Teshuva, Jacob. Art Treasures of the United Nations. New York: T. Yoseloff, 1964.
Toward World Peace:  Addresses and Public Statements 1957-1963 by U Thant, selected by Jacob Baal-Teshuva, foreword by Adlai E. Stevens: Toward World Peace. New York: Thomas Yoseloff, 1964.
The Mission of Israel, edited by Jacob Baal-Teshuva. The Mission of Israel. New York: Robert Speller & Sons, 1963

References

American art critics
Israeli art critics
Israeli expatriates in the United States
Israeli expatriates in France
Living people
1929 births
Place of birth missing (living people)
Hebrew University of Jerusalem alumni
New York University alumni